Sulkovci is a village in Požega-Slavonia County, Croatia. The village is administered as a part of the City of Pleternica.
According to national census of 2011, population of the village is 537. The village is connected by the D49 state road.

References

Populated places in Požega-Slavonia County